Budynia  is a village in the administrative district of Gmina Dąbie, within Krosno Odrzańskie County, Lubusz Voivodeship, in western Poland.

The village has a population of 58.

References

Budynia